Located in Ketchikan, Alaska, the Tongass School of Arts and Sciences (also known as TSAS) is a creative school. It has its own preschool and is available to grades K-6.

Art is taught by Loren McCue. She has facilitated public art installations by students at the Discovery Center, the Deer Mountain Hatchery, and the Ketchikan Visitors’ Center.

Brain-based learning is foundational. Highly Effective Teaching is the instructional model with a focus on promoting Life Skills and Lifelong Guidelines.

Charter schools in Alaska
Schools in Ketchikan Gateway Borough, Alaska